Girl Effect is an independent non-profit organization, launched in September 2015 with the goal of ending poverty globally.

History
Girl Effect was created in 2004 by the Nike Foundation, in collaboration with the NoVo Foundation and United Nations Foundation. It launched at the World Economic Forum in Davos.

Farah Ramzan Golant was appointed as the CEO. Maria Eitel, President and CEO of the Nike Foundation, was appointed chairman of the organization. In 2019, Jessica Posner Odede replaced Golant as CEO.

It has since become an independent organisation.

Awards
 At the Life Ball 2013 in Vienna, Austria, The Girl Effect was awarded the Life Ball Crystal of Hope Award donated by Swarovski, endowed with EUR 100,000.
Sep 2017 Technology Enabled Girl Ambassadors received an honorable mention in Fast Company’s sixth annual Innovation By Design Awards.

Critiques
This campaign has been the focus of feminist and academic critiques. The campaign was said to rely on essentialist views of womanhood. Further, these type of campaigns that do not take into consideration men and the relations of women and girls with their households and community often have the effect of overburdening women who are already responsible for childcare and all types of formal and informal labor.

See also
Chhaa Jaa

References

External links
Official website
India website

Organizations established in 2015
Poverty-related organizations